Dumas Malone (January 10, 1892 – December 27, 1986) was an American historian, minister, and biographer. He spent the majority of his career teaching at the University of Virginia (UVA), where he served as the Thomas Jefferson Foundation Professor of History. Malone was best known for his six-volume biography on Thomas Jefferson, Jefferson and His Time, for which he received the 1975 Pulitzer Prize for History. In addition, he was co-editor of the twenty-volume Dictionary of American Biography and was the director of the Harvard University Press. In 1983, he was awarded the Presidential Medal of Freedom. 

Malone's volumes were widely praised for their lucid and graceful writing style, their rigorous and thorough scholarship, and their attention to Jefferson's evolving constitutional and political thought. Among the many contributions of this authoritative study was Malone's inclusion in each volume of a detailed timeline of Jefferson's activities and frequent travels in his life. His eyesight deteriorated markedly as he became older, making it necessary to use various technologies such as voice recorders and a Visualtek to enlarge texts while writing his last two Jefferson books.

Malone also published a set of lectures, Thomas Jefferson as Political Leader (1963), with the University of California Press.

Early life and education
Malone was born in Coldwater, Mississippi, on January 10, 1892; he was the son of clergyman John W. Malone (1856–1930) and suffragist schoolteacher Lillian Kemp. Malone was raised in a poor, religious household which hailed from the Deep South, and his grandfather was a Confederate veteran who served in the American Civil War. Both Malone's mother and father were active educators who recognized the value of an intellectual upbringing—his mother fostered his early disposition for reading, and his father served as an academic at a variety of educational institutions. After Malone's birth, the family moved to Oxford, Mississippi, where the senior Malone served as president of the Woman's College of Oxford, later becoming a minister in Brunswick, Georgia; in 1902, Malone's father was made president of Andrew College.In 1906, Malone matriculated at Emory College (now Emory University) at age fourteen, receiving his bachelor's degree as the youngest member of its class of 1910. His education at Emory consisted primarily of classical courses supplemented by Latin and Greek literature, the latter of which he was influenced by the classicist Charles Peppler; Malone later reflected of Peppler's class, "If I am something of a classicist in spirit, that course is one of the reasons for it." He also took great inspiration from the economist Edgar H. Johnson, the instructor of the college's only history course, whose teaching Malone credited with leaving "an abiding impression." Despite doing well in the university's classics courses, he later recalled being "not a particularly good student," citing his youth and immaturity as reasons for having been unprepared in college. Malone played center for the class football team and was a member of the Sigma Nu fraternity, though otherwise graduated from the college relatively undistinguished. Regardless, he later fondly remembered Emory as a "modest home of humane learning." When the college inducted him into the Phi Beta Kappa honor society in 1930, Malone remarked, "That was lucky for me. I am sure they did not pay much attention to my old undergraduate record. I was too busy exploring life to do full justice to my studies."

Malone initially sought to study religion and enter the ministry upon graduating. He spent several years as a teacher in small, local schools; at Andrew College, he lectured on topics including mathematics, history, and the Bible. Finding a passion for teaching, he briefly taught biblical literature as an adjunct professor at Randolph-Macon Woman's College, where two of his sisters had been educated. After spending a year at Vanderbilt University, Malone enrolled in Yale Divinity School where he excelled academically, obtaining a Fogg scholarship for his first semester, and earning a Bachelor of Divinity in 1916. He had found his time at the university intellectually liberating, acquiring a passion for writing and abandoning his pursuit of theology in order to study history. Malone's studies were abruptly interrupted by World War I; he left Yale in 1917 to enlist in the U.S. Marine Corps after temporarily training as part of the Army YMCA at Camp Wheeler, becoming a Second lieutenant after graduating from Parris Island. However, the war ended before he saw active combat and he was discharged in January 1919. Malone subsequently returned to Yale to obtain a doctorate in history, enrolling as a graduate student; later that same year, he was appointed as an instructor of history and began teaching a course in American history for undergraduates. 

In 1921, Malone received his master's degree and, in 1923, earned his Doctor of Philosophy in history. His dissertation, The Public Life of Thomas Cooper, was awarded the John Addison Porter Prize; it had been supervised by the historian Allen Johnson, who had also been the one to recommend the topic to him. The thesis would later be used as the basis for Malone's first book, also titled The Public Life of Thomas Cooper, published in 1926. Following the completion of his doctorate, Malone was persuaded to join the faculty of the University of Virginia by its president, Edwin Alderman, during an interview at the American Historical Association and did so that same year.

Career

Virginia and the DAB 

In the fall of 1923, Malone assumed a position as an associate professor of history at the University of Virginia; his office was located at the top floor of the Alderman Library, where it would remain for some decades. The university had been relatively small at the time, and the whole of the history faculty consisted of just Malone and Richard Heath Dabney, the father of Virginius Dabney, upon his arrival. Dabney had been encumbered with the entirety of the history curriculum which spanned from ancient to modern; Malone undertook the courses in European and American history, giving up the courses in European history upon the arrival of Stringfellow Barr and thereafter introduced new courses in colonial history and more contemporary American history. It was during this period that Malone began an interest in the life of Thomas Jefferson, who is the university's founder; in his first year, he already authored a 14-page summary of Jefferson's life for the university's Extension Series in March 1924. Despite doubts by Allen Johnson and calls for caution by other scholars, Malone resolved to write a voluminous biography on Jefferson by the fall of 1926. The next year, he traveled to France with his newly-wed wife, Elizabeth Gifford (1898–1992), on a Sterling Traveling Fellowship to do more extensive research which formed the basis of an article entitled "Polly Jefferson and Her Father" published in the January 1931 edition of the Virginia Quarterly Review.

Malone's tenure at Virginia suddenly ended when Allen Johnson, his former mentor at Yale, extended an offer for him to take the co-editorship of the monumental Dictionary of American Biography (DAB) in 1929. He mulled extensively over the choice, consulting friends such as Arthur M. Schlesinger Sr. and President Edwin Alderman as to whether to accept the position. After reluctantly choosing to leave the University of Virginia, Malone moved with his wife to Washington, D.C., to assist Johnson with the dictionary, a choice which he called "the most painful decision I ever made." In January 1931, Johnson was unexpectedly killed in an automobile accident that made headlines in The New York Times and The Washington Post; his death made Malone the editor-in-chief of the DAB, a capacity which Malone continued to serve in until 1936. When the dictionary was finally completed—nearly a decade later—in 1942, it contained twenty volumes with the aid of more than 2,000 fellow biographers under his guidance. Malone found the seven years he had spent editing the DAB as being dull and tedious, stating, upon leaving, that he would never edit again. Nevertheless, he remembered the experience as being "invaluable to me as a writer because of what they taught me about precision and clarity," and would eventually return to editing later in his career. Malone's work in writing articles for the dictionary provided the foundation for his future biography on Jefferson and nurtured his interest for biographing.

Harvard University Press 

At the recommendation of Mark Antony De Wolfe Howe, Malone was suggested as a possible candidate to serve as the third director of the Harvard University Press (HUP). Harvard President James B. Conant, persuaded by the positive appraisals of Malone from those he consulted, extended an offer for him to take the position in December 1935. Malone accepted—provided he be able to finish his time on the DAB—and was formally appointed both as editor-in-chief (director) on December 1, 1937, and as board chairman, following a vote by the Harvard Corporation; he moved with his family to Lincoln, Massachusetts. In January of the following year, Malone described his new vision for the Press at a banquet dinner, advocating for what he called "scholarship plus"—the publication of works intended for the general public, as opposed to pieces meant exclusively for scholars. Ordered by Conant to "start from scratch," Malone instituted a number of ambitious changes which were among the most significant reforms in the its history: the leadership of the Printing Office was terminated, a new editorial staff was established to manage a more authoritative Press, and the old members of the Harvard Corporation resigned, giving way to the appointment of a number of prominent scholars. Conant also believed it appropriate for Malone to possess an academic title at the university and offered to name him as a professor of history, though Malone declined the post.

Malone viewed the role of the Harvard University Press as primarily an academic institution as opposed to a business. His administration of the Press achieved significant success, garnering wide recognition from the publication of several notable works—including two Pulitzer Prize-winners—and it saw a doubling in sales. Malone's aspiration of opening up the Press to the general public fueled a good reputation for producing important publications; in May 1941, Conant congratulated him, saying, "The general history of the Press for the past year is certainly one of which you may well be proud [...] Keep it up!" As the war continued, however, the Press' margins became strained by an increasing sales deficit, and the relationship between Malone and the university administration began to deteriorate over serious financial issues in the midst of World War II. William Henry Claflin Jr., Harvard's treasurer, enacted a series of cost-cutting measures which sought to limit the affairs of the HUP to be subordinate to a "strict economy;" in response, Malone appealed to university officials who, in turn, drafted a memorandum reaffirming the HUP's independence. 

With a stagnant audience for academic works and student enrollment waning during the war, Malone recalled his time as director to be "basically a lame-duck leader." When news reached Conant of a roughly $26,000 deficit the Press had accumulated during the 1942 fiscal year, his good relationship with it ended promptly. In January 1943, Malone's salary and duties were reduced; in April, a majority of officials doubted his future leadership in a vote of no-confidence. Following this rapid decline, Malone presented his letter of resignation on July 17, writing that "the major criteria by which my work is judged differ materially from those applied to the academic departments of the University." The Harvard Corporation accepted his request, and, in April 1943, Malone formally resigned his position as director in order to return to Virginia and begin work on his biography of Jefferson; he and his family moved to Charlottesville, Virginia, in the summer of that same year.

Return to Virginia 
Malone's ambition to write a comprehensive biography of Jefferson was secured on June 1, 1938, by means of a signed contract. Roger Scaife, the managing editor of Little, Brown and Company, presented the settlement to him for a multi-volume biography of Thomas Jefferson on March 22, 1938. Malone accepted, and, having been relieved from his duties at Harvard, dedicated his time to writing its first volume upon returning to Virginia. Despite the contract's generous payment and royalties, his personal finances remained burdened after years of amassing debt. In early 1944, the historian Douglas Southall Freeman recommended that Malone be supplemented by a grant from the Rockefeller Foundation. Since Malone was then unaffiliated with any institution and thus unable to satisfy the requirements for the grant, UVA President John Lloyd Newcomb and the university's librarian, Harry Clemons, arranged for him to be given the position of "honorary consultant in biography in the Alderman Library."

Legacy and honors

Malone was elected to the American Academy of Arts and Sciences in 1936. The following year, he was awarded an honorary Doctor of Letters by Dartmouth College and the University of Rochester. In 1951 and 1958, he was awarded a Guggenheim Fellowship. In 1972, he was awarded Yale University's Wilbur L. Cross Medal and the John F. Kennedy Medal of the Massachusetts Historical Society. In 1975, he was awarded the Pulitzer Prize for History—the oldest person to receive the award at the time. In 1982, he was awarded The Award for Distinguished Service to the Humanities of the Phi Beta Kappa Society. In 1983, President Ronald Reagan awarded Malone the Presidential Medal of Freedom. Malone was a member of the Virginia Historical Society. The trustees of the Thomas Jefferson Memorial Foundation established the Dumas Malone Graduate Research Fellowship at the University of Virginia in his honor, allotting funds to support the research of "outstanding, advanced graduate students."

When Queen Elizabeth II arrived in Charlottesville, Virginia, as part of her 1976 tour of the United States, Governor Mills Godwin gifted her the first five volumes of Jefferson and His Time—the sixth volume, The Sage of Monticello, had not yet been completed.

Malone's volumes concluded that it was impossible for Jefferson to have had a relationship with Sally Hemings.

Personal life and death 
Malone married Elizabeth Gifford in 1925, with whom he would have two children. He died on December 27, 1986, at his home in Charlottesville. According to the University of Virginia, the cause had been a "brief illness." He is buried at the University of Virginia Cemetery and Columbarium.

Footnotes

References

Scholarly sources

Books 

 
  excerpt

Journals

Further reading
 Robert M. S. McDonald, ed. Thomas Jefferson's Lives: Biographers and the Battle for History (University of Virginia Press, 2019) pp. 219–243 online

External links

Page at NNDB
Signature
Circular letter from Encyclopedia of the Negro, inc. to Dumas Malone, September 13, 1938
1939 Harvard University Press Director Dr. Dumas Malone Press Photo
Malone, Dumas - Rockefeller Archives
Letter from Anson Phelps Stokes to Dumas Malone, October 20, 1937
"The Scholar’s Way: Then and Now" by Dumas Malone

20th-century American biographers
20th-century American historians
American male non-fiction writers
Historians of the United States
Pulitzer Prize for History winners
Presidential Medal of Freedom recipients
Emory University alumni
Yale Divinity School alumni
United States Marine Corps officers
United States Marine Corps personnel of World War I
Historians from Mississippi
People from Coldwater, Mississippi
1892 births
1986 deaths
Burials at the University of Virginia Cemetery
20th-century American male writers